Spontaneous remission, also called spontaneous healing or spontaneous regression, is an unexpected improvement or cure from a disease that usually progresses. These terms are commonly used for unexpected transient or final improvements in cancer. Spontaneous remissions concern cancers of the haematopoietic system (blood cancer, e.g. leukemia), while spontaneous regressions concern palpable tumors; however, both terms are often used interchangeably.

Definition
The spontaneous regression and remission from cancer was defined by Everson and Cole in their 1966 book  as "the partial or complete disappearance of a malignant tumour in the absence of all treatment, or in the presence of therapy which is considered inadequate to exert significant influence on neoplastic disease."

Frequency of spontaneous regression in cancer
It has long been assumed that spontaneous regressions, let alone cures, from cancer are rare phenomena, and that some forms of cancer are more prone to unexpected courses (melanoma, neuroblastoma, lymphoma) than others (carcinoma). Frequency was estimated to be about 1 in 100,000 cancers; however, this proportion might be an under- or an overestimate. For one, not all cases of spontaneous regression can be apprehended, either because the case was not well documented or the physician was not willing to publish, or simply because the patient ceased to attend a clinic any more. On the other hand, for the past 100 years almost all cancer patients have received some form of treatment, and the influence of that treatment cannot always be excluded.

It is likely that the frequency of spontaneous regression in small tumors has been drastically underrated. In a carefully designed study on mammography it was found that 22% of all breast cancer cases underwent spontaneous regression.

Causes
Everson and Cole offered as explanation for spontaneous regression from cancer:

Challis and Stam, even more at a loss, concluded in 1989, "In summary, we are left to conclude that, although a great number of interesting and unusual cases continue to be published annually, there is still little conclusive data that explains the occurrence of spontaneous regression."

Apoptosis (programmed cell death) and angiogenesis (growth of new blood vessels) are sometimes discussed as possible causes of spontaneous regression. But both mechanisms need appropriate biochemical triggers and cannot initiate on their own. Indeed, in many cancer cells apoptosis is defective, and angiogenesis is activated, both of these effects being caused by mutations in cancer cells; cancer exists because both mechanisms are malfunctioning.

There are several case reports of spontaneous regressions from cancer occurring after a fever brought on by infection, suggesting a possible causal connection. If this coincidence in time would be a causal connection, it should as well precipitate as prophylactic effect, i.e. feverish infections should lower the risk to develop cancer later. This could be confirmed by collecting epidemiological studies.

Reviews
Rohdenburg (1918) summarized 185 spontaneous regressions
Fauvet reported 202 cases between 1960 and 1964
Boyd reported 98 cases in 1966
Everson and Cole described 176 cases between 1900 and 1960
Challis summarized 489 cases between 1900 and 1987
O'Regan Brendan, Carlyle Hirschberg collected over 3,500 references from the medical literature
Hobohm, in a meta-analysis, investigated about 1000 cases
Turner, in a qualitative research study, conducted interviews with 20 patients with spontaneous remissions
 Surviving Against All Odds - re sole survivor in "a gamma interferon study"

References

Further reading
 Uwe Hobohm: Healing Heat, 2014, 
 Uwe Hobohm: Harnessing Infection to Fight Cancer, American Scientist January–February 2009 
 The Body Can Beat Terminal Cancer — Sometimes. Discover Magazine, September 2007

External links
 Spontaneous remissions and an immunological explanation

Medical terminology
Oncology